In the late evening of 29 September 1998, a 5.5 magnitude earthquake occurred near the town of Mionica in western Central Serbia. The epicentral area was near the village of Brežđe, where it had a maximum intensity of VIII on the Mercalli intensity scale. It was felt in Central Serbia, Vidin (Bulgaria), Sarajevo (Bosnia) and parts of Croatia, Hungary and Greece. One person died from a heart attack and 17 were injured. Some 60 schools (mostly in villages) were damaged.

See also

List of earthquakes in 1998
2010 Serbia earthquake

References

Brijezde earthquake
1998 Brijezde earthquake
Mionica Earthquake, 1998
Earthquake